Lisa Rogers (born 7 September 1971) is a Welsh television presenter. She has appeared in films, television programmes, theatre and radio.

Early life
While at school, she took jobs in a chocolate factory, as a farrier, and, while studying drama at Loughborough University, she was a nanny and manager of Santa's grotto.

Television
Rogers started her television career behind the scenes working as a researcher on shows including Johnny Vaughan's  The Fall Guy, The Girlie Show, Absolutely Animals and Light Lunch with fellow researcher Dermot O'Leary.

While Rogers was working as an assistant producer and not wishing to miss the World Cup, a friend suggested she audition for the football show Under the Moon on Channel 4. She first starred on Channel 4's The Big Breakfast in June 2000, when she hosted the "Find Me a Weather Presenter" segment. This resulted in an irregular role, which led to later co-presenting, before the show ended in March 2002. She was also the presenter of the reality television show The Block. She played the character Tanya in the 2000 TV mini series Lock, Stock..., a spin-off from the film Lock, Stock and Two Smoking Barrels.

From 2002 to 2008, Rogers co-presented the Channel 4 engineering game show Scrapheap Challenge alongside Robert Llewellyn. To date, Rogers is the show's second-longest standing presenter, after Llewellyn. The duo also presented the spin-off series The Scrappy Races from 2003 to 2005. In 2003, Rogers also presented the ITV documentary series Mistresses, and appeared as a regular panellist on Loose Women.

As of 2008, Rogers has most recently been seen as the presenter of Sunshine for Channel 4, which previewed the new Danny Boyle film of the same name, and as a regular presenter of Sky One's motoring programme Vroom Vroom.

In August 2008, Rogers presented a documentary that ended up becoming a polemic about genital plastic surgery, The Perfect Vagina. In 2009, she reunited with Llewellyn for an episode of his web-based interview series Carpool.

Rogers is also one of eight celebrities chosen to participate in an intense week learning Welsh in an eco-friendly chic campsite in Pembrokeshire in the series cariad@iaith:love4language shown on S4C in May 2012.

Personal life
Rogers' family originates from Trellech near Monmouth.

In the summer of 2000, she started a relationship with actor Ralf Little. In 2003, she entered into a two-year relationship with former Stereophonics drummer Stuart Cable; Stuart was married at the time. They were seeing each other at the time he was sacked from the group. She currently lives in Monmouthshire with her two daughters, Florence and Mimi.

Rogers married in August 2015.

Television appearances

References

External links
 

1971 births
Living people
People from Monmouth, Wales
People from Lydney
Mass media people from Cardiff
Alumni of Loughborough University
British television presenters
People educated at Haberdashers' Monmouth School for Girls
Scrapheap Challenge